Esfandaran (also Romanized as Esfandārān; also known as Esfandān and Isfandūn) is a village in Ramsheh Rural District, Jarqavieh Olya District, Isfahan County, Isfahan Province, Iran. At the 2016 census, its population was 872, in 300 families.

References 

Populated places in Isfahan County